Evan "Van" Griffith Galbraith (July 2, 1928 – January 21, 2008) was the United States Ambassador to France from 1981 to 1985 under Ronald Reagan and the Secretary of Defense Representative to Europe and NATO under Donald Rumsfeld from 2002 to 2007.

Galbraith was born in Toledo, Ohio.  He graduated from Ottawa Hills High School in 1946 and was a graduate of Yale University (class of 1950, member of Skull and Bones) and Harvard Law School.  Galbraith served on active duty in the Navy from 1953 to 1957, attached to the Central Intelligence Agency. From 1960 to 1961, he was the confidential assistant to the Secretary of Commerce under Dwight Eisenhower. He was a close personal friend and Yale classmate of William F. Buckley, Jr. who died one month after Galbraith.

Prior to his post as Ambassador to France under President Ronald Reagan, Galbraith spent more than twenty years in Europe, primarily as an investment banker. He started his banking career at Morgan Guaranty in Paris selling and designing bonds and later became the Managing Director of Dillon Read in London in 1969. In the 1990s he was an Advisory Director of Morgan Stanley in New York, Chairman of the Board of National Review and a member of the board of the Groupe Lagardère S.A. Paris.  Together with Daimler Benz, the Groupe Lagardère S.A. controls EADS (European Aerospace and Defense Systems), Europe's largest defense contractor and principal owner of Airbus.  Galbraith also served on several other commercial boards and until 1998, was Chairman of the Board of LVMH (Moët Hennessy Louis Vuitton) USA. He also served as a Member of the Board of Directors of the Overseas Private Investment Corporation during the latter years of Reagan's administration. Secretary of Defense Donald Rumsfeld appointed Evan G. Galbraith as his representative in Europe and the defense advisor to the U.S. mission to NATO.  In making this appointment Rumsfeld said, "I wanted a seasoned, vigorous representative in Europe who will bring experienced leadership to this important mission."

Galbraith was also a member of The New York Young Republican Club, Center for Security Policy, Council of Foreign Relations and the Bohemian Club in San Francisco. He was also a member of the board of directors of Club Med Inc.

He was married twice. His first marriage, to Nancy Carothers Burdick, in 1955, ended in divorce in 1964. His second marriage was to Marie "Bootsie" Rockwell in 1964. He has three surviving children, all of his second marriage: Evan Griffith, Christina Marie and John Hamilton; and four grandchildren, Everest Griffith, Eva Quin, Sofia Christina Galbraith and Melinda Marie Galbraith. Two of his children predeceased him.  A daughter by his first marriage, Alexandra Galbraith Stearns, died in 2005, and his eldest child by his second marriage, Julie Helene, died at age six in 1972 of a brain tumor.  He is buried in Arlington National Cemetery.

Works
 Ambassador in Paris: The Reagan Years. Washington, DC: Regnery Gateway, 1987.  / .
Introduction by William F. Buckley, Jr.

References

External links

 "Why Do Things Work in Switzerland and Not in the U.S.A.?" Firing Line with William F. Buckley, Jr., Ep. 850, February 22, 1990. Guests: Evan G. Galbraith and Jacques Freymond. Full transcript available at the Hoover Institution.

1928 births
2008 deaths
Ambassadors of the United States to France
Yale University alumni
Harvard Law School alumni
Lawyers from Toledo, Ohio
20th-century American memoirists
Skull and Bones Society
20th-century American lawyers